Gabon is a country in Central Africa.

Gabon may also refer to:
Gabon River, the principal river of Gabon
Gabon, the original name of Libreville, now the capital of Gabon
Gaboń, a village in Poland
Gabon, an enemy in the video game Yoshi's Story

See also
Gaboon, tree